The 2013 World Series of Darts was the inaugural tour of the World Series of Darts organised by the Professional Darts Corporation. There were two  events of the tour, the Dubai Duty Free Darts Masters and the Sydney Darts Masters. The two tournaments featured slightly different formats. The Dubai Masters only seeing the top eight Order of Merit players in a seeded bracket over two days, with the Sydney masters seeing the top eight being joined by eight regional qualifiers.

World Series events

Quarter-finalists

References 

World Series of Darts